Idiakez is a surname. Notable people with the surname include:

Imanol Idiakez (born 1972), Spanish footballer and manager
Iñigo Idiakez (born 1973), Spanish footballer and manager, brother of Imanol
Irati Idiakez (born 1996), Spanish para-snowboarder

Basque-language surnames